Didžioji Street (literally: the Great Street) is a street in the Old Town of Vilnius, the capital of Lithuania. It currently connects Pilies Street and Aušros Vartų Street. The street surrounds the Vilnius Town Hall and in the past was visited by many well-known people including Francysk Skaryna, Mikołaj "the Black" Radziwiłł, Konstantinas Sirvydas, Joseph Frank, Christina Gerhardi-Frank, Jan Karol Chodkiewicz, Napoleon, Sophie de Choiseul-Gouffier, Fyodor Dostoevsky.

Gallery

References

Streets in Vilnius